Carl Forber is an English rugby league footballer who plays for Workington Town in Betfred League 1, as a goal-kicking scrum-half/stand-off. He has previously played for St Helens (Heritage № 1144), Leigh Centurions and Oldham (Heritage № 1278), although he only played twice in the Super League for St. Helens.

Playing career
Forber has represented Workington Town for the majority of his league career. He has chalked up over 300 appearances and over 1,000 points, playing as an accomplished Stand Off. Much of his points tally has come from his right boot. Converting for Workington time and again.

Forber earned a testimonial at Workington, where he was top points scorer in the 2017 League 1 rugby season. Forber is prolific with the boot. A place kick specialist. Forber has been a central player for Town in achieving playoff places over the years for the Betfred League 1 and a top scorer for the team during their successful 2021 Betfred Championship promotion season.

References

External links
Workington Town Profile

1985 births
Living people
Blackpool Panthers players
English rugby league players
Leigh Leopards players
Oldham R.L.F.C. players
Rugby league five-eighths
Rugby league halfbacks
Rugby league players from St Helens, Merseyside
St Helens R.F.C. players
Workington Town captains
Workington Town players